Gisèle Freund (born Gisela Freund; 19 December 1908 in Schöneberg District, Berlin 31 March 2000 in Paris) was a German-born French photographer and photojournalist, famous for her documentary photography and portraits of writers and artists. Her best-known book, Photographie et société (1974), is about the uses and abuses of the photographic medium in the age of technological reproduction. In 1977, she became president of the French Association of Photographers, and in 1981, she took the official portrait of French President François Mitterrand.

She was made Officier des Arts et Lettres in 1982 and Chevalier de la Légion d'honneur, the highest decoration in France, in 1983. In 1991, she became the first photographer to be honored with a retrospective at the Musée National d'art Moderne in Paris (Centre Georges Pompidou).

Freund's major contributions to photography include using the Leica Camera (with its ability to house one film roll with 36 frames) for documentary reportage and her early experimentation with Kodachrome and 35 mm Agfacolor, which allowed her to develop a "uniquely candid portraiture style" that distinguishes her in 20th-century photography.

She is buried at the Montparnasse Cemetery in Paris, France near her home and studio at 12 rue Lalande.

Biography

Freund was born into a textile merchant family on 19 December 1908 to Julius and Clara (née Dressel) Freund, a wealthy Jewish couple in the Schöneberg district of Berlin.

Her father, Julius Freund, was a keen art collector with an interest in the work of photographer Karl Blossfeldt, whose close-up studies explored the forms of natural objects. Freund's father bought Gisèle her first camera, a Voigtländer 6 × 9 in 1925 and a Leica camera as a present for her graduation in 1929.

In 1931, Freund studied sociology and art history at Albert-Ludwigs-Universität Freiburg, Breisgau, Germany; and in 1932 and 1933 she studied at the Institute for Social, Sciences, University of Frankfurt under Theodor W. Adorno, Karl Mannheim and Norbert Elias (also known as the Frankfurt School). At university she became an active member of a student socialist group and was determined to use photography as an integral part of her socialist practice. One of her first stories, shot on 1 May 1932, "shows a recent march of anti-fascist students" who had been "regularly attacked by Nazi groups".
 The photos show Walter Benjamin, a good friend of Freund, and Bertolt Brecht.

In March 1933, a month after Adolf Hitler rose to power in Germany, Walter Benjamin fled to Paris on 30 May, Gisèle followed him since she was both a socialist activist and a Jew. She escaped to Paris with her negatives strapped around her body to get them past the border guards.  Gisèle and Walter Benjamin would continue their friendship in Paris, where Freund would famously photograph him reading at the National Library. They both studied and wrote about art in the 19th and 20th centuries as Freund continued her studies at the Sorbonne.

In 1935, Andre Malraux invited Freund to document First International Congress in Defence of Culture in Paris, where she was introduced to and subsequently photographed many of the notable French artists of her day. Freund befriended the famed literary partners, Sylvia Beach of Shakespeare and Company, and Adrienne Monnier of Maison des Amis des Livres. In 1935, Monnier arranged a marriage of convenience for Freund with Pierre Blum so that Freund could obtain a visa to remain in France legally (they officially divorced after the war in 1948).

In 1936, while Sylvia Beach was visiting the United States, Freund moved into Monnier and Beach's shared apartment and they became intimates. When Beach returned, she ended her intimate relationship with Monnier yet maintained a strong friendship with both Monnier and Freund. Freund finished her Ph.D. in sociology and art at the Sorbonne in 1936, and Monnier published the doctoral dissertation as "La photographie en France au dix-neuvieme siècle", under the La Maison des Amis des Livres imprint by Monnier.

Monnier "introduced [Freund] to the artists and writers who would prove her most captivating subjects." Later that year, Freund became internationally famous with her photojournalistic piece, "Northern England", which was published in Life magazine on 14 December 1936, and showed the effects of the depression in England. No magazine in France could publish color photographs at that time, so Freund's work with Life—one of the first color mass magazines—would start a lifelong relationship between the photographer and magazine.

In 1938, Monnier suggested that Freund photograph James Joyce for his upcoming book, Finnegans Wake. Joyce, who disliked being photographed, invited Freund to his Paris flat for a private screening of her previous work. He was impressed enough by Freund's work to allow her to photograph him, and over a period of three days, she captured the most intimate portraits of Joyce during his time in Paris.

In 1939, after being "twice refused admission to Tavistock Square", Freund gained the confidence of Virginia Woolf and captured the iconic color photographs of the Woolfs on display in the English National Portrait Gallery. Woolf even "agreed to change her clothes to see which best suited the colour harmony and insisted on being photographed with Leonard (and their spaniel Pinka). In some of the prints, Woolf is pale and lined, in others smiling a little and more youthful. The background of fabrics and mural panels by Bell and Grant adds to the value of the images; this was the inner sanctum of the queen of Bloomsbury where parties were given and friends came to tea. Just over a year later the house was destroyed in The Blitz."

On 10 June 1940, with the Nazi invasion of Paris looming, Freund escaped Paris to Free France in the Dordogne. Her husband by convenience, Pierre, had been captured by the Nazis and sent to a prison camp. He was able to escape and met with Freund before going back to Paris to fight in the Resistance. As the wife of an escaped prisoner, a Jew, and a socialist, Freund "feared for her life".

In 1942, with the help of André Malraux, who told his friends, "we must save Gisele!", Freund fled to Buenos Aires, Argentina "at the invitation of Victoria Ocampo,  director of the periodical Sur. Ocampo was at the center of the Argentinean intellectual elite, and through her Freund met and photographed many great writers and artists, such as Jorge Luis Borges and Pablo Neruda."

While living in Argentina, Freund started a publishing venture called Ediciones Victoria. She writes, "In reality, I started this for the De Gaulle government in exile where I was working in the Information ministry, volontairement without payment." She also founds a relief action committee for French artists and becomes a spokesperson for Free France.

In 1947, Freund signed a contract with Magnum Photos as a Latin America contributor, but by 1954, she was declared persona non grata by the U.S. government at the height of the Red Scare for her socialist views, and Robert Capa forced her to break ties with Magnum. In 1950, her photocoverage of a bejewelled Eva Peron for Life magazine caused a diplomatic stir between the United States and Argentina and upset many of Peron's supporters—the ostentatious photographs went against the official party line of austerity; Life was blacklisted in Argentina, and once again, Freund had to escape a country with her negatives. She moved to Mexico and became friends with Diego Rivera, Frida Kahlo, Alfaro Siqueiros, and José Clemente Orozco. In 1953, she moved back to Paris permanently. Over the life of her career, she went on over 80 photojournalism assignments, primarily for Life and Time, but also Du, The Sunday Times (London), Vu, Picture Post, Weekly Illustrated, and Paris Match, among others.  From the 1960s onward, Freund continued to write, and her reputation as an important portrait photographer grew with each successive exhibition. She is now celebrated as one of the best portrait photographers of the twentieth century: Upon her death, "President Jacques Chirac praised her as 'one of the world's greatest photographers.

Notable work
In 1936 Freund photographed the effects of the Depression in England for Life. Freund's dissertation was published in book form by Adrienne Monnier (1892–1955). One of her best-known early works shows her friends Walter Benjamin and Bertolt Brecht participating in one of the last political street demonstrations in Germany before Hitler took power.

In 1938, Freund had the opportunity to photograph James Joyce in Paris through her connections with Adrienne Monnier and Sylvia Beach. Joyce hated being photographed, and during one of the sessions he hit his head on a light, which cut his forehead. Joyce exclaimed, "I'm bleeding. Your damned photos will be the death of me", which he said, "forgetting in his pain that he had made it a rule never to swear in the presence of a lady." Freund was in a taxi crash right after the photo-session, which caused her cameras to crash to the ground. She called Joyce and said, "Mr. Joyce, you damned my photos — you put some kind of a bad Irish spell on them and my taxi crashed. I was almost killed and your photos are ruined". Being superstitious, Joyce was convinced that his cursing in front of a lady had caused the crash, so he invited Freund back to his home for a second round of photographs. Time magazine used one of these photos for its cover on 8 May 1939. The entire series of photographs would eventually be published in 1965 in James Joyce in Paris: His Final Years by Freund and V. B. Carleton and a Preface by Simone de Beauvoir. Freund became famous for her portraits of literary geniuses, including Samuel Beckett, Virginia Woolf, George Bernard Shaw and many others.

In 1981, Freund made her official portrait of François Mitterrand, who was President of France (1981–1995).

In Freund's obituary for The New York Times, Suzanne Daley writes, "[Freund] specialized in conveying the attitude of her subjects. She focused on hands, body posture and clothing. Reviewing an exhibition of her life's work in 1979, Hilton Kramer wrote in The New York Times that she excelled in 'brilliant documentation rather than originality.' In a 1996 interview, Ms. Freund said she read her subjects' work and often spent hours discussing their books with them before taking a portrait." Indeed, it was Freund's ability to connect with writers and artists—especially the famously difficult James Joyce—that gave her the ability to photograph them with their guard down.

Quotations

From "Photographer" (1985)
 "For a writer, his portrait is the only link he can establish with his readers. When we read a book whose content moves us, we are interested to look at the author's face, which is generally printed on the jacket since the publisher is aware of our wish to see if these features correspond to the idea we have formed of the author. This image is thus very important to the man of letters. He prefers a photographer in whom he can have confidence."

From Photography & Society
 "The lens, the so-called impartial eye, actually permits every possible distortion of reality: the character of the image is determined by the photographer's point of view and the demands of his patrons. The importance of photography does not rest primarily in its potential as an art form, but rather in its ability to shape our ideas, to influence our behaviour, and to define our society" (4).
 "In our technological age, when industry is always trying to create new needs, the photographic industry has expanded enormously because the photograph meets modem man's pressing need to express his own individuality" (5).
 Although the first inventor of photography, Nicéphore Niépce, tried desperately to have his invention recognized, his efforts were in vain and he died in misery. Few people know his name today. But photography, which he discovered, has become the most common language of our civilization" (218).
 "When you do not like human beings, you cannot make good portraits."

Exhibitions

 1938 Private viewing for James Joyce in his Paris apartment (on his request to see if he liked her work)
 1939 La Maison des Amis des Livres, Paris, France
 1942 Galerie Amigos del Arte, Buenos Aires, Argentina
 1945 Palacio de Bellas Artes, Valparaiso Galeria de Arte, Buenos Aires, Argentina
 1946 Maison de l'Amerique latine, Paris, France
 1962 Musee des Beaux-Arts de la Ville a Paris—Petit Palais, France
 1963 "Le portrait francais au xxe siecle" [French portraiture in the 20th Century]" Bibliothèque nationale de France, Cabinet des estampes, Paris, France & Berlin and Dusseldorf, Germany
 1964 "Ecrivains et artistes francais et britanniques". Institut Francais du Royaume-Uni, London, U.K.
 1965 Princeton Art Museum, US
 1966 American Centre, Paris, France
 1968 "Au pays des visages, 1938-1968: trente ans d'art et de litterature a travers la camera de Gisèle Freund". [In the realm of faces: thirty years of art and literature through the lens of Gisèle Freund]. Musee Art moderne de la ville de Paris & Fondation Rayaumont, Asnieres-sur-Oise
 1973 Musee Descartes, Amsterdam, Netherlands
 1975 "Giselle Freund [sic]", Robert Schoelkopf Gallery, New York, US
 1976 Focus Gallery, San Francisco, California, US
 1977 "A Retrospective", Rheinisches Landesmuseum, Bonn, Germany [Gisèle Freund: Fotographien 1932-1977]; Musée Réattu, Arles; Fotoforum, Frankfurt; Documenta 6, Kassel, Germany; David Mirvich Gallery, Toronto, Canada.
 1978 Watari Museum of Contemporary Art, Tokyo, Japan; Shadai Gallery, Tokyo, Japan; Marcus Krakow Gallery, Boston, US
 1979 Sidney Janis Gallery, New York, US
 1980 Galerie Agathe Gaillard, Paris, France; Photo Art Basel, Switzerland
 1981 Galerie municipale du Chateau d'Eau, Toulouse, France; Center for Creative Photography, Tucson, Arizona, US; Axiom Gallery, Sydney, Australia.
 1982 Koplin Gallery, Los Angeles, US; The Photographers Gallery, London
 1983 Boston National Library, US; Center for Creative Art, New Orleans, US; Stanford University Museum
 1984 Fotoforum, Frankfurt, Germany
 1986 "Itinéraires", Galerie de France, Paris
 1987 Galerie zur Stockeregg, Zurich, Switzerland; "Photographs of James Joyce and Friends" Gotham Book Mart & Gallery, New York, US
 1988 "Gisèle Freund", Werkbund-Archiv, Museum der Alltagskultur des 20. Berlin, Germany
 1989 "Gisèle Freund: James Joyce, 1939", Galerie de France, Paris, France; "Gisèle Freund, James Joyce in Paris", Galerie Anita Neugebauer, Photo Art Basel, Switzerland & Bale, France
 1991 Photo Art Gallery, Bale, France
 1991 "Gisèle Freund, Itinéraires", Musée National d'Art Moderne, Centre Georges-Pompidou, Paris, France; "Frida Kahlo et ses amis", Galerie de France, Paris.
 1992 Center for Contemporary Art, Mexico
 1993 "Gisèle Freund", Seoul Museum, South Korea
 1994 Galerie Clairefontaine, Luxembourg
 1995 Museum of Modern Art, Frankfurt, Germany
 1996 "Gisèle Freund, 1st International Congress of Writers for the Defence of Culture, Paris 1935", Goethe Institute, Paris, France; Sprengel Museum, Hanover, Germany; "Malraux sous le regard de Gisele Freund, Galerie du Jeu de Paume, Paris, France; Verso Gallery, Tokyo, Japan; Galerie Michiko Matsumoto, Tokyo, Japan; "Gisele Freund: Berlin, Frankfurt, Paris: Fotographien 1929-1962, Berliner Festspeil, Berlin, Germany
 1999 "Adrienne Monnier, Saint John Perse et les amis des livres", Musee Municipal Saint John Perse; Point-a-Pitre, and the Fondation Saint John Perse, Aix-en-Provence, France
 2002 "El mon i la meva camera-Gisèle Freund", Centre de Cultura Contemporanea, Barcelona; Fundacio Sa Nostra, Palma de Majorque, Spain
 2006 "Susana Soca and her circles seen by Gisèle Freund", Maison de l'Amerique latine, Paris, France; Montevideo, Uruguay; Soca, Uruguay
 2008 "Gisèle Freund, ritratti d'autore" Galleria Carla Sozzani, Milan, Italy; "Gisèle Freund reframes Berlin, 1957-1962", Ephraim-Palais, Berlin.
 2011–2012 "Gisèle Freund: L'Œil frontière, Paris 1933-1940"
 2014 "From Paris to Victoria: Gisèle Freund's James Joyce Photographs". University of Victoria, Canada
 2014 "Gisèle Freund: Photographic scenes and portraits"
 2015 "Frida Kahlo: Mirror, Mirror".

Books published by Gisèle Freund
 "La photographie en France au dix-neuvieme siècle" [French Photography in the 19th Century], Paris, La Maison des Amis des Livres, (1936)
 "France" (1945)
 Guia Arquitectura Mexicana Contemporánea [Guide to Contemporary Mexican Architecture]
 "Mexique precolombien" [Pre-Columbian Mexico]  (1954)
 "James Joyce in Paris. His final years" (1965)
 "Le monde et ma camera" [The World and My Camera] (1970)
 "Photographie et societe" [Photography and Society] (1974)
 "Memoires de l'Oeil" [My Eye's Memories] (1977)
 "Portfolio: Au pays des visages" [Portfolio: the Landscape of faces] (1978)
 "Trois Jours avec Joyce" [Three Days with Joyce] (1982)
 "Itineraires" [Itinerary] (1985)
 "Gisèle Freund, photographer" (1985)
 "Gisèle Freund, Portraits d'ecrivains et d'artistes [Gisèle Freund's Portraits of writers and Artists] (1989)
 "Gisèle Freund, portrait. Entretiens avec Rauda Jamis [Portrait: Interviews with Rauda Jamis] (1991)
 "The Poetry of the Portrait: Photographs of Writers and Artists" (1998)
 "La Photographie en France au dix-neuvieme siecle" [Revised and expanded edition with Andre Gunthert] (2011)

Awards
 1989 Doctor honoris causa, National Museum of Photography at Bradford University
 1983 Chevalier de la Légion d'Honneur (France)
 1982  Officier des Arts et Lettres (France)
 1980 Grand prix national des Arts pour la Photographie (France)
 1978 German Society's cultural photography prize (Germany)
 1977 Elected President, French Federation of Creative Photographers (France)

Books about Gisèle Freund
 2015 Frida Kahlo: The Gisèle Freund Photographs
 2011 Catalogue de l'exposition Gisèle Freund L'Oeil Frontière Paris 1933-1940
 1998 Gisèle Freund
 1994 You have seen their faces : Gisèle Freund, Walter Benjamin and Margaret Bourke-White as headhunters of the thirties
 1991 Catalogue de l'œuvre photographique Gisèle Freund

Film and television

The 1996 documentary Paris Was a Woman features interviews with Dr. Gisèle Freund as she recollects her experiences in Paris during the 1930s.

1979 Zeugen des Jahrhunderts [Witnesses of the Century].

Rights and permissions

Freund's estate is managed through l'Institut Mémoires de l'édition contemporaine (IMEC), Paris, France.

References

External links

French photographers
1908 births
2000 deaths
French women photographers
Jewish emigrants from Nazi Germany to France
20th-century photographers
20th-century French women artists
French LGBT photographers
20th-century women photographers
20th-century LGBT people